The 2015–16 Jacksonville Dolphins women's basketball team represents Jacksonville University in the 2015–16 NCAA Division I women's basketball season. The Dolphins, led by third year head coach Yolett McPhee-McCuin, play their home games at Swisher Gymnasium and were members of the Atlantic Sun Conference. They finish the season 22–11, 11–3 in A-Sun play to finish in second place. They won the Atlantic Sun Tournament to earn an automatic trip to the NCAA women's tournament for the first time in school history where they lost to South Carolina in the first round.

Media
All home games and conference road games were shown on ESPN3 or A-Sun.TV.

NCAA invitation 
The Jacksonville Dolphins took on the Florida Gulf Coast Eagles, who had not lost a game to a conference opponent on their home court in the prior 71 games, in the Atlantic Sun championship game. The Dolphins did not hold the lead in the second half until Brandi Buie hit a baseline jumper with just over three seconds left in the game. The Eagles were unable to score on the last possession, so Jacksonville won the tournament championship and an invitation to their first ever NCAA tournament. The Dolphins are now on an eight-game winning streak.

Roster

Schedule

|-
!colspan=9 style="background:#004D40; color:#FFFFFF;"| Exhibition

|-
!colspan=9 style="background:#004D40; color:#FFFFFF;"| Non-conference regular season

|-
!colspan=9 style="background:#004D40; color:#FFFFFF;"| Atlantic Sun regular season

|-
!colspan=9 style="background:#004D40; color:#FFFFFF;"| Atlantic Sun Women's Tournament

|-
!colspan=9 style="background:#004D40; color:#FFFFFF;"| NCAA Women's Tournament

See also
2015–16 Jacksonville Dolphins men's basketball team

References

Jacksonville
Jacksonville Dolphins women's basketball seasons
Jacksonville